FC Fazisi Racha is a Georgian association football club.

Racha was promoted from Regionuli Liga in 2006. The club left Pirveli Liga in mid of 2007–08 season.
The club in 2007–08 changed its name to FC Fazisi Racha.

Seasons
{|class="wikitable"
|-bgcolor="#efefef"
! Season
! League
! Pos.
! Pl.
! W
! D
! L
! GF
! GA
! P
!Cup
! Europe
! Notes
! Manager
|-
|2006–07
|bgcolor=#ffa07a|Pirveli Liga
|13
|34
|9
|12
|13
|41
|49
|39
|?
|
|
|
|-
|2007–08
|bgcolor=#ffa07a|Pirveli Liga West
| 10
| 27
| 2
| 2
| 23
| 17
| 73
| 8
|?
|
|Relegated
|
|-
|2008–09
|
| 
| 
| 
| 
| 
| 
| 
| 
|?
|
|
|
|-
|2009–10
|
| 
| 
| 
| 
| 
| 
| 
| 
|?
|
|
|
|-
|2010–11
|bgcolor=#98bb98|Meore Liga West A
| 
| 
| 
| 
| 
| 
| 
| 
|?
|
|
|
|-
|2011–12
|bgcolor=#98bb98|Meore Liga West A
| 
| 
| 
| 
| 
| 
| 
| 
|?
|
|
|
|-
|}

Football clubs in Georgia (country)